North Kazakhstan Region is a region of Kazakhstan, with a population of 539,111. Its capital is Petropavl, with a population of 193,300 people.

History

During the 19th century, the territory of the region was home to several Middle Zhuz tribes, including Argyns, Kerei, and Kypshak. During the late 19th and early 20th centuries, the region underwent significant resettlement as a result of the opening of the Siberian railway and the Stolypin agrarian reform. As a result, Ukrainians became the majority population in the northern regions of Kazakhstan and the area was referred to as the "Grey Wedge."

In the early 20th century, the North Kazakhstan region was the center of the Akmola province of the Kirghiz Autonomous Soviet Socialist Republic (ASSR). The West Siberian uprising, a large anti-Bolshevik armed uprising, was suppressed by the Reds during this time. The North Kazakhstan region was officially formed from the northern regions of the Karaganda region and the Karkaralinsky district in 1936.

In 1939, the city of Stepnyak and 11 southern districts were ceded to the newly formed Akmola region. In 1966, the North Kazakhstan region was awarded the Order of Lenin. The administrative-territorial reform of 1997 resulted in the inclusion of several districts of the abolished Kokchetav region into the North Kazakhstan region, which had a large proportion of the Kazakh population. The region's structure included modern districts such as Akkayynsky, Esilsky, Zhambylsky, Bulaevsky, and Timiryazevsky, among others, in which the Russian population was predominantly still living.

Geography
The region borders Russia (Omsk Oblast, Kurgan Oblast and Tyumen Oblast) to the north, and also borders three other Kazakhstan regions: Akmola Region to the south, Pavlodar Region to the east and Kostanay Region to the west. The Kokshetau Hills stretch along the southern part, limited to the north by the West Siberian Plain. The Ishim (Esil) River, a tributary of the Irtysh River, flows from Karagandy Region to Russia through North Kazakhstan Region. The Sileti river also flows through the region.

Demographics

Ethnic groups

Religion

Administrative divisions
The region is administratively divided into thirteen districts and the city of Petropavl. 
 Akkayin District, with the administrative center in the selo of Smirnovo;
 Akzhar District, the selo of Talshik;
 Aiyrtau District, the selo of Saumalkol;
 Esil District, the selo of Yavlenka;
 Gabit Musirepov District, the selo of Novoishimskoye;
 Kyzylzhar District, the selo of Beskol;
 Magzhan Zhumabaev District, the town of Bulayevo;
 Mamlyut District, the town of Mamlyutka;
 Shal akyn District, the town of Sergeyevka;
 Taiynsha District, the town of Taiynsha;
 Timiryazev District, the selo of Timiryazevo;
 Ualikhanov District, the selo of Kishkenekol;
 Zhambyl District, the selo of Presnovka.

The following five localities in North Kazakhstan Region have town status: Petropavl, Bulayevo, Mamlyutka, Sergeyevka, and Taiynsha.

Sport
The regional bandy team took part in the national championship in 2016.

External links
Official website

References

 
Regions of Kazakhstan